In enzymology, a tRNA (uracil-5-)-methyltransferase is an enzyme that catalyzes the chemical reaction

S-adenosyl-L-methionine + tRNA containing uridine at position 54  S-adenosyl-L-homocysteine + tRNA containing ribothymidine at position 54

Thus, the two substrates of this enzyme are S-adenosyl methionine and tRNA containing uridine at position 54, whereas its two products are S-adenosylhomocysteine and tRNA containing ribothymidine at position 54.

This enzyme belongs to the family of transferases, specifically those transferring one-carbon group methyltransferases.  The systematic name of this enzyme class is S-adenosyl-L-methionine:tRNA (uracil-5-)-methyltransferase. Other names in common use include ribothymidyl synthase, transfer RNA uracil 5-methyltransferase, transfer RNA uracil methylase, tRNA uracil 5-methyltransferase, m5U-methyltransferase, tRNA:m5U54-methyltransferase, and RUMT.

References

 
 
 
 
 
 
 

EC 2.1.1
Enzymes of unknown structure